Doug Clarke (born 11 May 1938) is  a former Australian rules footballer who played with Richmond in the Victorian Football League (VFL).

Notes

External links 
		

Living people
1938 births
Australian rules footballers from New South Wales
Richmond Football Club players